Oliver Zompro is a German biologist who is credited with the discovery in 2002 of a new suborder of carnivorous African insects, Mantophasmatodea or "gladiators", which was originally considered to be a new insect order but was later relegated to subordinal status.

Zompro initially described gladiators from old museum specimens that originally were found in Namibia (Mantophasma zephyrum) and Tanzania (M. subsolanum), and from a 45-million-year-old specimen of Baltic amber (Raptophasma kerneggeri).

Live specimens were found in Namibia by an international expedition in early 2002; Tyrannophasma gladiator was found on the Brandberg Massif, and Mantophasma zephyrum was found on the Erongoberg Massif.

References

External links 
 New insect order found in Southern Africa
 New order of insects identified: Mantophasmatodea find their place in Class Insecta
 Man discovers a new life-form at a South African truck stop

German entomologists
Living people
Year of birth missing (living people)